Uwe Proske (born 10 October 1961) is a German former fencer. He competed in the individual épée event for East Germany at the 1988 Summer Olympics. Four years later, he won a gold in the team épée event for Germany at the 1992 Summer Olympics.

References

External links
 

1961 births
Living people
German male fencers
Olympic fencers of East Germany
Olympic fencers of Germany
Fencers at the 1988 Summer Olympics
Fencers at the 1992 Summer Olympics
Olympic gold medalists for Germany
Olympic medalists in fencing
People from Löbau
Medalists at the 1992 Summer Olympics
Sportspeople from Saxony